Kabataan News Network (KNN) is a show on Philippine television.
Presently, there are more than 160 KNN reporters, aged 14–19 and stationed in 12 bureaus nationwide namely Metro Manila, Metro Cebu, Metro Davao, Mountain Province, Zamboanga del Sur, Camarines Norte, North Cotabato, Capiz, Sarangani, Dumaguete, San Jose, Mindoro and Baguio.

ABS-CBN original programming
2006 Philippine television series debuts
Filipino-language television shows